Walter Jackson "Chule" Milner (January 19, 1913 – November 14, 1965) was an American football player and coach.  He served as the head football coach at the College of Mines and Metallurgy of the University of Texas—now known as the University of Texas at El Paso (UTEP)—in 1942, after playing for the Miners from 1931 to 1933. Milner had previously served as the head football coach at Austin High School in El Paso, Texas where he led his 1937 team to an undefeated season.

Milner was killed on November 14, 1965, in an automobile accident near El Paso.

Head coaching record

College

References

External links
 

1913 births
1965 deaths
UTEP Miners football players
UTEP Miners football coaches
High school football coaches in Texas
People from Bell County, Texas
Players of American football from Texas
Road incident deaths in Texas